Nivis, amigos de otro mundo is an Argentine children's television series, produced by Metrovision Producciones S.A.. It was broadcast by Disney Junior Latin America on July 20, 2019 and May 18, 2020.

Plot
After the Nivis family's holidays, they arrive on the planet Earth and accidentally hit the wall at three Amigos' house. The Nivis, a family from the planet Nivilux, arrive on Earth by accident when their ship crashes at the home of Amadeo, Felipe and Isabella. Over time, the extraterrestrial family, Blink, Nika, Baldo and Nox, co-exist with the human family and share funny and moving moments in the assembly of both worlds.

Broadcast
The series began in Argentina on the Disney Junior Latin America channel on July 20, 2019. The second season of the series waspremiered on March 9, 2020, on the same channel. In November 2020, the series was available for streaming on Disney+ in Latin America.

Cast and characters
NIVIS CAST
 Raul Anaya as Baldo
 Mateo Suaréz as Blink
 Liliana Barba as Nika
 Pamela Mendoza as Valentina (voice)

HUMANS CAST
 Vinícius Campos as Felipe Amigo
 Gustavo Masó as Amadeo Amigo
 Lourdes Errante as Isabella Amigo
 Valentina Steffens as Delfina
 Joaquina Zorrilla as Valentina
 Clara Saccone as Florencia
 Claribel Medina as Maria Soledad "Marisol"

List of episodes
Season 1 (2019)
 Vivendo con los Nivis
 Brócolis en el espacio
 La roca de Cristalix
 Salvemos las pelotas
 La trompa
 Una mañana agitada
 El Nuevo Amigo de Blink
 El juego de las escondidas
 La colección
 ¡FUERA, NIVIS!
 Hay que limpiar el cuarto
 Soñando despierta
 Valentina la espía
 Tarde de juegos
 La mermelada
 El divertinivi
 ¿Qué haríamos sin Felipe?
 La celebración de la unión
 El día del buen vecino
 El libro de Felipe
Season 2 (2020)
 La nave contraataca
 Una visita inesperada
 ¡Vamos a despegar!
 Los celos de Felipe
 Comida para Nox
 Felipe, el misterioso
 El misterio de las castañas
 El plan de Blink
 Las tres Isabellas
 Vecinos solidarios
 El celular
 Las dos fiestas de cumpleaños
 Un miedo de otro planeta
 La competencia
 El perdón
 Las cocineras
 Un pequeño héroe llamado Blink
 El arquero fantasma
 La entrevista
 Hasta que se pongan de acuerdo
 La despedida

Soundtrack

The soundtrack album was released on June 28, 2019, by Walt Disney Records on digital streaming, and contains eight songs in Spanish.

Track listing

Nivis, amigos de otro mundo – Vol. 2

The second soundtrack was released on February 24, 2020, in digital streaming format by Walt Disney Records, and contains seven songs. 

Track listing

References

External links

2019 Argentine television series debuts
Argentine children's television series
Musical television series
Television series by Disney
Disney Junior original programming
Children's comedy television series
Children's science fiction television series
2010s preschool education television series
Cultural depictions of Laurel & Hardy
Television series about extraterrestrial life
Television series about families
Television series about vacationing
Television series with live action and animation